Guzal Darreh may refer to:
 Guzal Darreh-ye Sofla
 Guzal Darreh Rural District